Mount Phillips, formerly called Clear Creek Mountain was renamed in 1960 in honor of the then living Waite Phillips, who donated the area to the Boy Scouts of America.

Philmont Scout Ranch

Mount Phillips is the second highest peak in Boy Scouts of America's Philmont Scout Ranch in the central country on the western perimeter.  It is an easy hike from Comanche Peak, but it is a much steeper ascent from Clear Creek to its  summit.  There are four close trail camps in the area of the summit, but none have water.  These are Mount Phillips, Comanche Peak, Thunder Ridge and Red Hills Camps, which, except for Red Hills Camp, are all dry.  The staff camp of Clear Creek is the closest camp with water.

Geology
The mountain consists primarily of the metamorphic rock, pink gneiss, which is quite evident as small boulders on the trail.  The true summit is marked with a flagpole toward the north side.  A few crosses have sprung up in this area, having great meaning to the groups that have erected them.  It is scarce of trees and gives great views to the north, east and west.  This is not true for the south, due to the gentle incline of the terrain in this direction.  From the southern false summit, a good view of Angel Fire Ski Area is possible

See also
Tooth of Time
Cimarron Range
Culebra Range
Eagle Nest Dam
Sangre de Cristo Mountains
Geography and ecology of Philmont Scout Ranch

References

Phillips
Sangre de Cristo Mountains
Landforms of Colfax County, New Mexico
Philmont Scout Ranch
Mountains of Colfax County, New Mexico